Villa Reale may refer to:

 Villa Reale in Monza
 Villa Belgiojoso Bonaparte, in Milan
 Villa Reale di Marlia in Capannori, Province of Lucca, Tuscany